Metallic Diseases is the first album by the Italian experimental rock band Starfuckers, released in 1989.

Track list
From Discogs.
 Love you
 Cans
 Shake Off
 Western Man
 Dead Metal City Blues
 The Right Side
 U.S.A.
 Cold White Cancer
 (I'm) Alive!
 Flower Lover

References

1989 albums
Starfuckers albums